Flour Bluff High School is a public high school in Corpus Christi, Texas (USA). It is part of the Flour Bluff Independent School District.

The Texas Education Agency's 2009 accountability rating was "Recognized"

Student demographics
As of the 2017–2018 school year, Flour Bluff High had a total of 1,812 students (49.1% White, 38.0% Hispanic, 3.6% African American, 2.4% Asian, 0.1% Pacific Islander and 0.2% Native American).

Facility
Opened in 1967
New additions and renovations completed in 1999
91 Classrooms
Cafetorium (900 capacity)
Teaching Theater (150 capacity)
Auditorium (1325 capacity)
2 Gymnasiums
Library
Football Field
Running Track
Multi-Purpose Facility
Indoor Football Facility
Natatorium
Baseball/Softball Fields
ROTC Pavilion

Extra-curricular activities
The Navy Junior Reserve Officers' Training Corps cadets have, as of 2019, won the high school military drill team national championships for 27 years, and as of 2013, the Area 10 Navy championship 19 consecutive times

The Academic Decathlon team has, as of 2006, gone on to the state competition twelve times.

Flour Bluff High School came under fire in 2011 in a scandal that received national attention, due to the district's initial refusal to allow students to form a GSA (Gay-Straight Alliance) on campus, despite allowing FCA (Fellowship of Christian Athletes) factions in their high school and junior high. (FBISD initially denied the formation of the GSA due to the fact that it was a 'non-curricular' club. When it was pointed out that the FCA and other clubs were also non-curricular, and still allowed to meet on campus, all clubs were briefly suspended. Due to parent and student outrage, several clubs were reinstated.) This refusal was found to contradict the First Amendment, as well as the Equal Access Act.

In Spring 2011, a petition was circulated to allow the formation of the GSA. The ACLU (American Civil Liberties Union) sent a letter to Superintendent Carbajal on March 2, 2011, requesting the formation of the club be allowed.

It was eventually decided that the GSA be allowed to form, and meet on campus.

Athletics
The Flour Bluff Hornets compete in these sports –

Cross Country, Volleyball, Football, Basketball, Swimming/Diving, Soccer, Golf, Tennis, Track, Softball & Baseball.

For Football, Flour Bluff competes in 5A Division 1.

Notable alumni
Lou Diamond Phillips, actor.
Paulette Guajardo, politician.

References

External links
Flour Bluff ISD

High schools in Corpus Christi, Texas
Public high schools in Texas
1967 establishments in Texas